Tigo is a telecommunication company in Tanzania. 

With over 13.5 million registered subscribers to their network, Tigo, directly and indirectly, employs over 300,000 Tanzanians including an extended network of customer service representatives, mobile money merchants, sales agents and distributors.

Tigo is the biggest commercial
brand of Millicom, an international company trading in 12 countries with commercial operations in Africa and Latin America and corporate offices in Europe and the USA.

History
In 1993, there was liberalization of telecommunication sector in the country which resulted in the dissolution of Tanzania Posts and Telecommunications Corporation (TPTC) in early 1994. MIC Tanzania Limited  was granted a licence November 30, 1993. The corporation was a joint venture between  Millicom International Cellular based in Luxembourg, Ultimate Communications Limited of Tanzania and Tanzania Posts and Telecommunications Corporation Bibi. In this venture, 27.7% of the issued share capital was allotted to the Ultimate Communications Limited and Tanzania Posts and Telecommunications Corporation.

Mobitel 
The company began operations in 1994 under the name Mobitel and launched Tanzania's first cellular (analogue) service. In 1998 the company expanded significantly and began pre-paid service under the brand "Simu Poa" and began issuing pre-paid cards under the brand "Kadi Poa".

In 1999 Adesemi Tanzania another telecommunication company operating in the country was acquired by Mobitel and it gave Mobitel customers access to the companies Private Automatic Branch Exchange networks. At the time Mobitel was the first company in Africa that provided subscription-free Internet services under their "MobiNet" brand.

in September 2000, with a partnership with Ericsson Mobitel launched its digital GSM network in Dar es Salaam. Both networks were run simultaneously, with the GSM network in the cities and the analogue network in rural areas. The GSM network was marketed under the brand "Buzz", while the analogue network remained under the "Kadi Poa" brand. The analogue network was continually phased out and was eventually shutdown in September 2005.

In February 2004, MIC's parent company Millicom International Cellular took over the 26% stake from the government to control 84% of the company's equity.

Re-branding to tiGO 
In February 2006, after buying out its minority shareholders, the Luxembourg-based pan-African mobile operator  Millicom International Cellular announced to take a full control of three of its African-based Mobile operators including MIC Tanzania limited. In Tanzania a USD 1.332 million deal enables Millicom to acquire the remaining 16% stake it did not already own after the cellco's minority shareholders agreed to cancel their call option on the business. Since then Millicom is the full controller of the company.

After this take over the company re-branded the company from "Buzz" to "tiGO", in line with the company's operations globally. Since then the company has been at the fore-front of innovation and has grown its customer base tremendously.

Initial public offering 
In December 2016, in accordance to the government law, tiGO Tanzania applied to list the company on the Dar es Salaam Stock Exchange, but as of April 9 2019 it was yet to go public.

Mobile Services

Mobile money 
Tigo like all telecommunication brands in Tanzania operates Mobile money services. Currently tigo operates the second largest network and subscriber base for mobile money services in Tanzania. In 2014, the company became the first company in the world to share its profit with its subscribes through mobile money. The company issues quarterly dividends to customers based on their daily balance in their Mobile wallet.

Tigo Pesa also became, in 2014, the first in Africa to provide a fully inter operable mobile money service network; that allowed its customers to trade money between Vodacom, Airtel and Zantel. The service also extended to Tigo in Rwanda and the company was the pioneer in East Africa's first cross-border money transfer mobile wallet product. The gateway allowed customers in Rwanda and Tanzania to send money to tiGO customers in the respective countries.

4G LTE 
In December 2015, Tigo Tanzania launched 4G LTE services in Dar es Salaam. The company was the first in the country to bring 4G and 3G speeds to its customers and possibly one of the first companies in Africa to provide LTE services.

Statistics 
The Table below shows the number of subscribers tiGO has in December of the year based on figures by Tanzania Communication Regulatory Authority.

 Reports numbers as of Dec 2017.

See also
  3G Technology

References

External links

Telecommunications companies of Tanzania
Telecommunications companies established in 1993
Dar es Salaam
1993 establishments in Tanzania
Mobile phone companies of Tanzania